The Super W is a women's rugby union competition held in Australia. The inaugural season was in 2018, when it replaced the former National Women's Rugby Championship. The  are the most successful team so far, .

Teams
Six women's rugby teams compete in the Super W:

Champions

By year

Notes

By overall placings

Notes

Players
For the inaugural season, the teams' playing lists were constructed from scratch throughout the later stages of 2018.

Clubs were asked to nominate a list of desired players, with the Super W assigning two of these "marquee" players to each club. In addition, clubs were able to sign a number of players with existing connections to the club, or with arrangements for club sponsored work or study. 

All participants are required to be 17 years of age or older.

Media coverage

Television
During the 2020 season all matches were televised live by affiliate partners Fox Sports. Following Rugby Australia's broadcast deal with Nine Network, all games will be broadcast on streaming service Stan Sport, with one game a round being simulcast on Nine's flagship free to air channel.

Online
All matches are streamed live by Stan Sport.

Corporate relations

Sponsorship
Buildcorp is the league's naming rights partner. Gilbert is the official supplier of all rugby balls.

Merchandising
Official match day attire together with other club merchandise is sold through the Super W's stores and website as well through the clubs and through some retailers.

See also

Australia women's national rugby union team
Australia women's national rugby sevens team
Women's rugby union in Australia
Super Rugby Aupiki

References

External links
 Official page on Rugby Australia webpage

 
Super Rugby
2018 establishments in Australia
Sports leagues established in 2018
Women's
Women's rugby union competitions in Australia
Rugby union
Fox Sports (Australian TV network)
Rugby union competitions for provincial teams
Professional sports leagues in Australia